Six Flags Over Texas is a 212-acre (86 ha) amusement park, in Arlington, Texas, east of Fort Worth and west of Dallas. It is the first amusement park in the Six Flags chain, and features themed areas and attractions. The park opened on August 5, 1961, after a year of construction and an initial investment of US$10 million by real estate developer Angus G. Wynne, Jr.

The park is managed by the Six Flags Entertainment Corp., which owns a 54% interest of the Texas Limited Partnership that owns the park. Six Flags Over Texas Fund, Ltd, a private-equity and asset-management firm, headed by Dallas businessman Jack Knox, bought the park in 1969. Over the years, the various companies that managed the park exercised options to purchase interest in the fund. Six Flags Entertainment has an option to purchase the remaining 46% in 2028. In 1991, Time Warner Entertainment began managing park operations. In 1998, Time Warner sold its interests in the Six Flags parks to Premier Parks, of Oklahoma City, which later changed its name to Six Flags Theme Parks, Inc.

History

After a visit to Disneyland in Anaheim, California, shortly after its opening, a wealthy real estate developer, Angus G. Wynne, Jr., concluded that his home state, Texas, should have a similar park. Planning for such a place began in 1959, under the leadership of Wynne and the Great Southwest Corporation, along with the backing of various New York City investors. Construction of the park began in August 1960.

The name "Six Flags Over Texas" refers to the flags of the six nations that have governed Texas: Spain, France, Mexico, the Republic of Texas, the United States of America, and the Confederate States of America. Wynne originally intended to name the park "Texas Under Six Flags". Various legends have attributed the name change to his wife, Joann; to the Daughters of the Republic of Texas, of which his wife may have been a member; and to his entertainment director, Charles Meeker, who is said to have stated "Texas isn't 'under' anything." The original park was divided into six themed areas for each of the six entities that had ruled Texas. Other themed areas have since been added.

Six Flags Over Texas opened its gates from July 29 to August 4, 1961, to several local corporations that Wynne had invited as part of a "soft-test opening". The park held its grand-opening ceremonies on Saturday, August 5, 1961. Dignitaries included the mayors of Arlington, Dallas, Fort Worth, Grand Prairie, and Irving. Park attendance reached 8,374. Admission cost $2.75 for adults and $2.25 for children; parking cost 50 cents; hamburgers, 35 cents; soft drinks, 10 cents. On opening day, guests could visit the six original themed sections: Mexico, Spain, France, The Confederacy, Texas, and Modern (representing the United States). According to the 1961 Park Map there were 46 "major attractions". The park's first season, lasting 45 days and ending on November 25, 1961, was a success, with over 550,000 visitors.

The 1960s were a decade of growth for Six Flags Over Texas. The park added numerous attractions, including two new sections: Boomtown, named after the boomtowns that sprang up rather quickly during Texas' oil boom era and the "Tower Section", named after the Oil Derrick observation tower built in 1969. The park also witnessed the birth of two classic theme park attractions: El Aserradero in 1963 and the Runaway Mine Train roller coaster in 1966. Attendance reached close to 2 million visitors a year by the end of the decade. For 1974, Six Flags Over Texas announced attendance had reached 2,184,000.

For the 50th anniversary (2011), Six Flags Over Texas introduced the first I-Box roller coaster track with a transformation of Texas Giant. The reception from the conversion led the manufacturer to bring the new technology all over the world.  During this time, Six Flags (the company) began the company-wide process of removing licensed theming across its theme parks from attractions that the park had built in previous years. For example, Six Flags Over Texas had to rename and retheme Tony Hawk's Big Spin to Pandemonium.

In 2020, the park began, for the first time in its history, operating at a year-round schedule. Before 2020, Six Flags Over Texas ran seasons from March to the end of that specific year. Within three months into the longer season (March 13, 2020), Six Flags suspended all operations across all of its properties due to concerns of the COVID-19 pandemic in Texas. During the time of closure, the park donated food and supplies to local charities. The park reopened to members and season pass holders on June 19 and to the general public on June 22.

Attractions

First-of-their-kind features or attractions
 First Six Flags Theme Park. This is the original Six Flags Theme Park, opened on August 5, 1961
 First Pay one Price (POP) admission
 First theme park to feature Broadway-style shows (1961)
 First Intamin Ride, the Jet Set 
 First Log Flume – El Aserradero (1963)
 First Mine Train Roller Coaster – The Runaway Mine Train (1966)
 First relaunch of the modern-day parachute ride - Texas Chute Out (1976) Removed in 2012.
 First Freefall Ride - Texas Cliffhanger (later renamed G-Force and then Wildcatter) (1982). Removed in 2007.
 First RMC I-Box hybrid coaster - New Texas Giant (2011)

Records
 Tallest Roller Coaster in Texas - Titan (245 ft)
 Fastest Roller Coaster in Texas - Titan (85 mph)
 Largest Land Based Oil Derrick - Oil Derrick (300 ft)
 2nd Tallest Swing Ride in the World - Texas Skyscreamer (400 ft)

Awards
 Texas Giant named World's Best Wooden Roller Coaster in 1998 and 1999 by Amusement Today'''s Golden Ticket Awards.
 New Texas Giant named Best New Coaster of 2011 by Amusement Todays Golden Ticket Awards.

Events
Six Flags Over Texas hosts a number of events for different holidays all throughout the operating season that often draws thousands of visitors to the park.
 Fright Fest – Originally only one night in October called 'Fright Night', Fright Fest is the annual Halloween festival at Six Flags Over Texas. Fright Fest takes place throughout the month of October and features several specialized additions to the park. Haunted houses, decorated pathways, patrolling ghouls and spooky music all contribute to the park's transformation into a giant 'scream' park. In 2020, the park reimagined their Halloween event to Hallowfest, due to the COVID-19 pandemic. The change from Fright Fest to Hallowfest, includes no haunted houses and indoor shows.
 Holiday in the Park''' – A tradition started in 1985, Holiday in the Park is now one of the park's most popular seasonal events as the park's season winds down towards the end of November and throughout December. Hundreds of thousands of Christmas lights are strung around the park buildings and rides. An authentic snow hill is available for visitors to sled down. Festive holiday shows, arts and crafts, and delicious seasonal food also bring the holidays to Six Flags Over Texas.

Controversy
The Confederacy was one of the original themed areas and it showcased Civil War re-enactments and displayed the Confederate Battle Flag. In the 1990s it was rethemed to "Old South" and all Confederate Battle Flags were removed. The land drew little attention as there were no high-profile rides in that area. However, the Confederate "stars and bars" remained one of the six flags that was flown at the park entrance. In August 2017, in response to the controversial Unite the Right rally that was held in Charlottesville, Virginia, the park replaced its six flags (which had included the first Confederate flag, a Republic of Texas flag, a 19th-century Spanish flag, an 18th-century French flag, a 19th-century United States flag, and a 19th-century Mexican flag) with six American flags. A representative of the park told KXAS-TV, "We always choose to focus on celebrating the things that unite us versus those that divide us. As such, we have changed the flag displays in our park to feature American flags."

References

 Jordan, Scott L. MousePlanet - This Old Park. Retrieved September 21, 2004.
 McCown, Davis. ParkTimes. Retrieved September 21, 2004.
 Rogers, Joel A. CoasterGallery.com. Retrieved September 21, 2004.
 Six Flags - Media Info. Retrieved September 21, 2004.

External links

 Six Flags Over Texas official website
 
 Video featuring archival footage of Six Flags Over Texas
 Collection of films and videos documenting Six Flag Over Texas

 
Dallas–Fort Worth metroplex
Landmarks in Texas
Over Texas
Buildings and structures in Tarrant County, Texas
Amusement parks in Texas
1961 establishments in Texas
Tourist attractions in Tarrant County, Texas
Amusement parks opened in 1961